John Thompson Limited was a major engineering business based in Wolverhampton offering products for the nuclear engineering industry.

History
The Company was founded by William Thompson as a general engineering concern in or around 1820 in Wolverhampton. In 1850 the business passed to William's brother, Stephen, and in 1860 it passed to William's son, John, and within ten years it was concentrating on manufacturing boilers.

By 1914 it had expanded into motor pressings; during World War I it made cowlings for Sopwith aircraft and in World War II it made airscrews for Spitfire and Hurricane aircraft.

In the 1950s, as part of a consortium with AEI, it was awarded a contract to supply boilers and reactor pressure vessels for Berkeley nuclear power station.

In 1970 the business was acquired by Clarke Chapman and in 2004 the Ettingshall Works finally closed.

External links
 Grace's guide

References

Technology companies established in 1820
British companies established in 1820
Manufacturing companies based in Wolverhampton
Engineering companies of the United Kingdom
Nuclear technology companies of the United Kingdom
Technology companies disestablished in 2004
British companies disestablished in 2004
1820 establishments in England
2004 disestablishments in England